Amal Syam (born December 14, 1962) is a member of the Palestinian group Hamas. She served as the Minister of Women's Affairs in the March 2007 unity cabinet of the Palestinian National Authority.

References 

Hamas members
Al-Quds University alumni
Women government ministers of the Palestinian National Authority
Women's ministers
Government ministers of the Palestinian National Authority
Living people
1962 births

Academic staff of Al-Quds Open University